Isaac "Ike" Perlmutter (born December 1, 1942) is an Israeli-American billionaire businessman and financier. He is the chairman and former CEO of Marvel Entertainment. He was also the owner of Remington Products and Marvel Toys.

Early life 
Isaac Perlmutter was born to a Jewish family in then the British Mandate of Palestine (present-day Israel). He grew up in the State of Israel, serving in the Israeli military (IDF) during the Six-Day War of 1967. He emigrated to America, arriving in New York City with only $250, and he earned a living standing outside Jewish cemeteries in Brooklyn, leveraging his Hebrew skills to lead funeral services for tips.

Later he sold toys and beauty products on the streets of New York City, which eventually evolved into selling surplus stock and end-of-line items at a big profit.  Although he never attended a university, he taught himself how to read a balance sheet and supposedly became good at spotting overlooked value in weak and distressed companies.

Career

Revco 
With a new partner, Bernard Marden, and leveraging the skills he attained as a wholesaler, he formed a company called Odd Lot Trading, a wholesaler and retailer of closeout items. In May 1984, they sold Odd Lot to Revco Discount Drug Stores in exchange for 12% of Revco stock. He soon challenged Revco management for control of the company but, after initial positive feedback, was rejected. Perlmutter and his partner threatened a hostile takeover but eventually refrained and sold their share back to Revco for $120 million.

Coleco 
Perlmutter had a close relationship with the management of toy manufacturer Coleco Entertainment Corporation as he had been purchasing unsold inventory from them for some time. As is typical in the industry, payment terms were often unusual. With Coleco, Perlmutter would purchase unsold inventory in exchange for 50% cash and 50% in "barter advertising credits" (basically a promise to pay for the future advertising expenses of Coleco).  Over a four-year period, Perlmutter had received $144 million in goods and paid $73 million in cash along with providing $71 million in barter advertising credits to be paid in the future.

In 1988, he saw an opportunity as Coleco struggled under its debt due to the advent of the personal computer which impacted the sale of video games. Perlmutter bought all of Coleco's senior debt (with $85 million in face value) for $50 million, a substantial discount, becoming senior to their bondholders in the event of a bankruptcy. Although Perlmutter believed that a Coleco bankruptcy was probable, he also believed that the value of the Coleco's assets should be sufficient to cover the full $85 million in value that he had purchased. In July 1988, Coleco filed for Chapter 11 bankruptcy. The bondholders, suspicious over Perlmutter's close relationship with Coleco's management, sued Perlmutter alleging fraudulent conveyance over the barter advertising credits (which made up a very significant item on Coleco's balance sheet). After extensive negotiation, a settlement was reached whereby Coleco would be sold to Hasbro Corporation for $85 million and Perlmutter would accept $64 million for his now $90 million claim (principal plus interest) in exchange for the withdrawal of the lawsuit.

Remington 
In 1994, Victor Kiam sold controlling interest of Remington Products to Isaac Perlmutter. Perlmutter became Vice President of Remington. Kiam and Perlmutter sold Remington to Vestar Capital Partners in 1996.

Marvel 
Isaac Perlmutter was a member of the board of directors of Marvel Comics beginning in April 1993 and was chairman of the board until March 1995.

Isaac Perlmutter also was the co-owner, with Avi Arad, of Toy Biz (later Marvel Toys), having purchased its predecessor company from Charan Industries in January 1990. Toy Biz, Inc. was reorganized in the Marvel deal with Perlmutter continuing to own the original Toy Biz, Inc., which was renamed Zib, Inc. Zib held its foreign sales affiliate, Toy Biz International Ltd., a Hong Kong corporation and Perlmutter's share of the new Toy Biz, Inc.

When the Marvel Group went bankrupt in 1996, protracted legal battles over control of the company followed between Perlmutter, Arad, Carl Icahn, and Ronald Perelman. By 1997, Perlmutter and Arad had established control over the company, pushing out Icahn and Perelman. ToyBiz and Marvel were merged into Marvel Enterprises to bring it out of bankruptcy in June 1998 with ToyBiz becoming a division of the new company.

On November 30, 2001, Perlmutter became vice chairman of Marvel. He became the chief executive officer of Marvel Comics on January 1, 2005. He remained CEO of Marvel Entertainment, even after the acquisition of Marvel by The Walt Disney Company on December 31, 2009. Although Perlmutter received $800 million in cash and $590 million in Disney stock after the acquisition, he did not want a seat on Disney's board of directors.

In September 2015, Perlmutter stopped overseeing the development of Marvel Studios. Disney felt the studio head, Kevin Feige, should report directly to the chairman of The Walt Disney Studios, Alan Horn, so that all cinematic properties of Disney, including Pixar and Lucasfilm, were under one management structure. The restructuring was allegedly due to Feige's "frustration" of working with Perlmutter as well as some alleged controversial comments and actions by Perlmutter, such as replacing the casting of Terrence Howard as James Rhodes with Don Cheadle because black people "look the same." A person with knowledge of his creative approach said, "Ike Perlmutter neither discriminates nor cares about diversity, he just cares about what he thinks will make money." Jeph Loeb, who oversaw Marvel Television and the television properties of the Marvel Cinematic Universe, still reported to Perlmutter up until 2019.

Philanthropy 
In 1993, Perlmutter and his wife established the Laura and Isaac Perlmutter Professorship and Chair in Cell Biology at the Skirball Institute of Biomolecular Medicine (part of the New York University School of Medicine). Perlmutter's wife Laura has served as a trustee on the NYU Medical Center's Board of Trustees since 1993 and Perlmutter has served as a trustee since 2014.

Isaac and Laura Perlmutter are major contributors to NYU Langone Medical Center. In January 2014, the couple made a $50 million gift from their foundation to establish the Laura and Isaac Perlmutter Cancer Center at NYU Langone, followed by a $5 million gift from their foundation to establish the Laura and Isaac Perlmutter Cosmetic Plastic Surgery Center at NYU Langone, a $9 million gift to fund cancer research at NYU Langone and the Technion – Israel Institute of Technology, and a $1 million gift to support the medical center's Beatrice W. Welters Breast Health Outreach and Navigation Program.

In the spring of 2020, in response to the COVID-19 pandemic, Isaac and Laura Perlmutter took part in funding the donation of an estimated 50 tons of food to the Palm Beach County Food Bank. In addition to the food bank, the couple contributed to providing meals to the staff at both Good Samaritan Medical Center and St. Mary's Medical Center, as well as five hospitals in New York City.

Issac and Laura Perlmutter are also supporters and contributors to The Innocence Project which exonerates the wrongly convicted through DNA testing and reforms the criminal justice system to prevent future injustice.

Political involvement 
In 2015, Laura Perlmutter donated $2 million to a Super-PAC supporting the presidential candidacy of Sen. Marco Rubio.

In January 2016, according to Donald Trump, Isaac intended to donate $1 million to the presidential candidate's wounded veterans initiative at Drake University.

On June 30, 2016, Laura Perlmutter donated $449,400 to a PAC supporting Donald Trump, and later was part of Trump's Inauguration committee.

In 2019, Ike and Laura Perlmutter donated roughly $360,000 to the "Trump Victory Joint Fundraising Committee."

Leadership at the Department of Veterans Affairs 

In April 2017, Perlmutter was categorized by The New York Times as one of the "Clubgoers" among twenty people whom President Trump consults "outside the White House gates". He "has been informally advising ... on veterans issues [and] ... has been a presence" at Mar-a-Lago, according to the account.

In August 2018 non-profit news organization ProPublica reported that Trump had informally authorized three members of his Mar-a-Lago club to direct policy at the United States Department of Veterans Affairs (VA) and issue instructions to Secretary of Veterans Affairs Peter O'Rourke.  Perlmutter was named among the three, collective known as the Mar-a-Lago Crowd.  The author of the article obtained "hundreds of documents" through the Freedom of Information Act that show the three were in daily contact with the agency, "reviewing all manner of policy and personnel decisions" and that "they prodded the VA to start new programs, and officials travelled to Mar-a-Lago at taxpayer expense to hear their views." VA staffers have claimed that the three men got control over the department as "spoils" to reward them for their support of Trump. Their influence over the VA, including VA staff traveling to Mar-a-Lago to meet with them, carried on into 2019.

Personal life 
Early in his career, Perlmutter met his wife Laura J. Perlmutter at a Catskills resort and they married soon after. They divide their time between homes in Palm Beach, Florida, close to Mar-a-Lago, and New York City. They have no children.

Perlmutter takes great pride in never having given an interview over his entire career despite being in the public eye due to his many court battles and bankruptcy fights. He has rarely been spontaneously photographed.

Companies 
Marvel Entertainment
Marvel Studios (formerly)
Remington Products Company
Odd Lot Incorporated, retail discount chain
REC Sound Incorporated
Classic Heroes, Inc.,  majority stockholder, an apparel manufacturing distributor
Tangible Media
Westwood Industries, Inc., table and floor lamps  manufacturer and distributor
Zib, Inc.

See also 
List of Israeli Americans
Avi Arad

References

External links 
 Profile of Isaac Perlmutter from BusinessWeek magazine
 Profile of Isaac Perlmutter from Reuters

American chief executives
American financiers
American investors
Living people
1942 births
Marvel Entertainment people
Mandatory Palestine people
American Jews
Businesspeople from New York City
Israeli emigrants to the United States
American billionaires
Israeli soldiers
Israeli Jews
Marvel Comics people